Eremophila gracillima is a flowering plant in the figwort family, Scrophulariaceae and is endemic to Western Australia. It is a low, spreading shrub with narrow leaves which have their edges folded under, and lilac to violet flowers. It is restricted to an area near Mount Vernon.

Description

The tube is lilac-coloured to violet, and white with violet spots inside. The outside of the tube and petal lobes is hairy while the inside of the lobes is glabrous and the inside of the tube is hairy. The 4 stamens are fully enclosed in the tube.

Taxonomy and naming
The species was first formally described by Robert Chinnock in 2007 and the description was published in Eremophila and Allied Genera: A Monograph of the Plant Family Myoporaceae. The specific epithet (gracillima) is from the superlative form of the Latin word gracilis, meaning "slender", hence "most slender" referring to the leaves of this species.

Distribution and habitat
Eremophila gracillima is found near Mount Vernon in the Gascoyne and Murchison biogeographic regions where it grows on rocky flats.

Conservation status
This species is classified as "Priority Three" by the Government of Western Australia Department of Parks and Wildlife, meaning that it is poorly known and known from only a few locations but is not under imminent threat.

References

gracillima
Eudicots of Western Australia
Plants described in 2007
Endemic flora of Western Australia
Taxa named by Robert Chinnock